Diplacus johnstonii is a species of monkeyflower known by the common name Johnston's monkeyflower.

Distribution
It is endemic to the Transverse Ranges of southern California, where it is known only from the San Gabriel and San Bernardino Mountains. It grows in rocky and disturbed habitat, such as roadsides and scree.

Description
Diplacus johnstonii is an annual herb producing a thin, hairy stem up to about 20 centimeters tall. The oppositely arranged pointed oval leaves are 1 to 3 centimeters in length.

The tubular base of each flower is encapsulated in a reddish, hairy calyx of sepals with spreading, pointed lobes. The flower is dark pink to magenta in color with a yellow spot and usually two purple spots in its throat. It is up to 1.5 centimeters long and has five lobes at its mouth.

References

External links
Jepson Manual Treatment — Mimulus johnstonii
USDA Plants Profile: Mimulus johnstonii
Mimulus johnstonii — U.C. Photo gallery

johnstonii
Endemic flora of California
Natural history of the Transverse Ranges
~
~
Flora without expected TNC conservation status